The Rufiji–Ruvuma languages are a group of Bantu languages established by Gloria Waite (1979) and subsequent researchers: N10 (less Manda), P10 (Ngindo moved to N10), P20.

The languages, or clusters, along with their Guthrie identifications are:

Ruvuma (P20):
Yao–Mwera
Makonde: Makonde–Machinga, Mabiha
Mbinga
Ruhuhu (N10): Matengo, Mpoto
Matandu (P10): Matumbi, Ndengereko (Rufiji)
Lwegu:  Ngindo (P10), Ndendeule, Ndwewe (N10)
Songea (N10): Ngoni

Among the Guthrie languages not specifically classified are Nindi (N10, said to be close to Ndendeule); and Tonga of Malawi (N10).

Nurse moves Manda to Bena–Kinga, but Ehret keeps it here.

Notes